Ángel Sánchez (born 24 November 1974) is a Cuban former judoka who competed in the 1996 Summer Olympics and in the 2000 Summer Olympics.

References

1974 births
Living people
Olympic judoka of Cuba
Judoka at the 1996 Summer Olympics
Judoka at the 2000 Summer Olympics
Cuban male judoka
Pan American Games medalists in judo
Universiade medalists in judo
Pan American Games gold medalists for Cuba
Judoka at the 1999 Pan American Games
Universiade silver medalists for Cuba
Medalists at the 1999 Pan American Games
20th-century Cuban people
21st-century Cuban people